The Liaohe Bridge is a bridge in over the Eastern Liao River in Yingkou, Liaoning, China. The bridge is a five-span cable-stayed structure 866 meters in length.

See also
List of longest cable-stayed bridge spans

References

External links

Cable-stayed bridges in China
Bridges completed in 2010
Bridges in Liaoning